This is a list of players who earned 25 or more caps for the Portugal national football team. For all players who have played for Portugal, see :Category:Portugal international footballers.

As of March 2022, 116 players have reached this milestone for Portugal. The record for the most caps is held by Cristiano Ronaldo, with 190 caps since 2003; he overtook Luís Figo's record of 127 caps in June 2016. The only other players with a century of caps are Fernando Couto, Nani, João Moutinho, Pepe and Rui Patrício; Patrício is also the most capped Portuguese goalkeeper, with 102 international matches played since 2010.

The first player to reach 25 caps was Xico, in his final appearance on 17 June 1951. The most recent player to gain their 25th cap was Rúben Neves, on 12 October 2021.

Players
Appearances and goals are composed of FIFA World Cup and UEFA European Championship matches and each competition's required qualification matches, as well as UEFA Nations League matches, FIFA Confederations Cup matches and numerous international friendly tournaments and matches. Players are listed by number of caps, then number of goals scored. If number of goals are equal, the players are then listed alphabetically. Statistics correct as of 2 June 2022.

References

 
Association football player non-biographical articles